Tadhg Furlong (born 14 November 1992) is an Irish rugby union player for Leinster in the United Rugby Championship and European Rugby Champions Cup. Furlong made his international debut for Ireland in 2015 and has won 62 caps. In 2017 and 2021, he toured with the British & Irish Lions, winning 6 test caps. His usual position is tighthead prop.

Early life
Furlong comes from a farming family in the parish of Horeswood in County Wexford. He started his rugby playing underage at New Ross RFC in County Wexford.

Furlong also played Gaelic football and Hurling for Horeswood for which he was coached by Jimmy Furlong.

Professional
Furlong made his senior debut for Leinster Rugby in November 2013 as a replacement against the Dragons. He was part of the Leinster A team which won the 2013–14 British and Irish Cup. Ahead of the 2014–15 season, Furlong was promoted from the Leinster Academy to the senior squad. 

In 2021 Furlong was selected to World Rugby's Dream Team of the Year.

International

Ireland
Furlong made his Ireland senior debut on 29 August 2015 against Wales in a warm-up game for the 2015 Rugby World Cup.
He was named in the Ireland squad for the World Cup on 1 September 2015.
In November 2016, Furlong started for Ireland in the Autumn Internationals, including the historical victory over New Zealand on 15 November 2016. He also played for Ireland in the 2017 Six Nations Championship.

Lions
Furlong was selected in Warren Gatland's squad for the 2017 British & Irish Lions tour to New Zealand. He started all three test matches in the drawn series.

On 6 May 2021, Furlong was named in the squad for the 2021 British & Irish Lions tour to South Africa.

Honours

Individual
World Rugby Dream Team of the Year
Winner (2): 2021, 2022

Ireland
Six Nations Championship:
Winner (2):  2018, 2023
Grand Slam:
Winner (2):  2018, 2023
Triple Crown:
Winner (3): 2018, 2022, 2023

Leinster 
Pro14:
Winner (4): 2017-18, 2018-19, 2019-20, 2020-21
European Rugby Champions Cup:
Winner (1): 2018

References

External links

Leinster Profile
Pro14 Profile

Ireland Profile
British & Irish Lions Profile

1992 births
Living people
Gaelic footballers who switched code
Sportspeople from County Wexford
Rugby union props
Irish rugby union players
Leinster Rugby players
Ireland international rugby union players
British & Irish Lions rugby union players from Ireland
Alumni of Dublin City University
People educated at St Augustine's and Good Counsel College, New Ross